Telegraphs in Negative/Mouths Trapped in Static is a double album by the Canadian musical collective, Set Fire to Flames. The album was recorded in the span of several months in late 2002, and was then published by both Alien8 Recordings and FatCat Records in 2003.

The album itself was recorded in a barn in rural Ontario, Canada. The recording atmosphere was decidedly informal—the sounds of the band members talking and moving around can be readily heard during the album's quiet moments. Like their first album, Telegraphs in Negative/Mouths Trapped in Static was recorded "in states of little or no sleep, in varying levels of intoxication, and in physical confinement."

The release utilizes many different instruments, including guitars, basses, strings, horns, glockenspiel, marimba, bass clarinet, cymbalon, hurdy-gurdy, music boxes, modified electronics, saw, and contact microphones.

Track listing

Personnel 
 Beckie Foon: cello
 Bruce Cawdron: drums, percussion, marimba
 Christof Migone: gutted two-track motors, contact mics, faulty electronics
 David Bryant: guitar, tapes
 Fluffy Erskine: saw, percussion, music box, tapes
 Genevieve Heistek: viola
 Gordon Krieger: bass clarinet
 Jean-Sébastien Truchy: electric bass, double bass, music box
 Mike Moya: guitar, tapes
 Roger Tellier-Craig: guitar, CD player, tapes
 Sophie Trudeau: violin, glockenspiel, trumpet
 Thea Pratt: French horn

References

External links 
 Informational page on Telegraphs in Negative/Mouths Trapped in Static from official set fire to flames website

2003 albums
Set Fire to Flames albums
Alien8 Recordings albums
FatCat Records albums